An employee ownership trust (EOT) holds a permanent or long-term shareholding in a company on trust for the benefit of all the company’s employees.  An EOT provides indirect (trust) employee ownership of a company.

Among the different forms of employee ownership, the trust model may, in particular, be chosen instead of employees owning shares directly because it can be used to organise an employee buy-out, without requiring finance from employees, provides a long-term ownership model and is straightforward to administer. 
This trust model of employee ownership has been promoted since 2012 by the UK Government and is now the main form of employee ownership in the UK.
The EOT ownership model is also recognised in the US (where it may be labelled differently, such as perpetual trust, steward-ownership trust) as an alternative to the ESOP.

The Trust Model of Employee Ownership 
There are three basic forms of employee ownership: Direct Ownership of shares by all employees as individuals; Indirect Ownership on behalf of all employees by the trustee of an employee trust; and the Hybrid Model which combines both direct and indirect ownership. An EOT is a form of indirect ownership in which the trustee of the EOT holds shares in a permanent or long-term trust on behalf of all employees. The EOT can also be used in a hybrid model, that is, where the EOT has a shareholding, held alongside employees as individual shareholders (and/or possibly other investors). The EOT shareholding must act in conjunction with an organisational structure that ensures employee engagement within the relevant company (or group) for the company to have employee ownership.

Use of EOTs 
An employee ownership business model is a way of achieving benefits for a business, its employees, and society.  The trust model has the following characteristics in comparison to employee ownership models involving direct employee share ownership:

 it can be used to finance a transition to employee ownership using contributions from the business itself, rather than from individual employees;
 it provides a stable and long-term structure for employee ownership including a vehicle, the EOT, that looks after the best interests of both present and future employees and facilitates giving employees a collective “voice”; and
 it makes the tax and overall administrative procedures more straightforward than operating individual employee share (or share option) plans.
 
Research in EOT owned companies showed higher scores in the values of fairness, trust, excellence, humility and courage among employees, with no significant differences between seniority levels.  Research into EOT owned companies also shows that employee ownership works well to meet the aspirations of the millennial generation, and reveals that millennials value many characteristics of the employee ownership business model, such as profit sharing and personal development, more than previous generations did.

EOTs in the UK 
The EOT was promoted by the UK Government (along with other types of employee ownership) in the years following the 2012 Nuttall Review of Employee Ownership.  The EOT was recognised in UK tax law in 2014 when tax exemptions were introduced to encourage its use. The Nuttall Review and the EOT tax exemptions have helped increase the number of UK employee-owned companies.

Nuttall Review of Employee Ownership 
The UK has a long history of employee ownership in various forms, including the trust model. In 2012, Graeme Nuttall was appointed as the UK Government’s independent adviser on employee ownership to “work with Government to identify the barriers to employee ownership and help find the solutions to knock them down”. The resulting Nuttall Review advocated, in particular, the merits of employee ownership through a trust, which provides a long-term structure and one suited to achieving employee engagement and to supporting employee buyouts.  The Nuttall Review supported tax changes to raise awareness of employee ownership and contained various recommendations which were broadly supported by the Government. Graeme Nuttall worked with HM Treasury regarding possible new tax incentives.

In Autumn 2012, HM Treasury and HM Revenue and Customs confirmed support for implementing the Government’s response to the Nuttall Review and that the Government was considering further incentives to support this objective. The Government recognised that a range of employee ownership models may be legitimately applied, including employee benefit trusts that are not aimed at avoiding tax.

In 2013, the Government announced that following the findings of the Nuttall Review, it had decided to introduce two tax reliefs to encourage, promote and support indirect employee ownership structures.  These exemptions would go some way towards supporting existing and newly-created indirect employee ownership structures in the same way that tax advantaged employee share plans already encourage direct employee share ownership. The tax reliefs also promote awareness of the sector and increased the attractiveness of indirect employee ownership structures for businesses which might be considering converting.

Finance Act 2014 
The UK Finance Act 2014 created a definition of an EOT for UK tax purposes.  This definition limits the discretion of the EOT's trustee.  The EOT must not permit:

 any property in the trust to be applied otherwise than for the benefit of all employees of the relevant company and any group companies (subject to some limited exceptions) on the same terms (see further below);
 the trustee of the EOT to apply any trust property: 
 by creating a new trust; or 
 by transferring property to the trustee of any settlement other than, broadly, another EOT; 
 the trustee to make loans to any beneficiaries; or 
 the terms of the EOT to be amended in such a way as to permit any of the above.

The Finance Act 2014 also introduced:
a complete exemption from capital gains tax arising in connection with the sale of shares to an EOT, so as to give the trustee a controlling interest in a company, and
an income tax (but not national insurance contributions) exemption for certain discretionary bonuses of up to £3,600 per employee per tax year paid to employees of a company (or group) controlled by an EOT.

There are a number of conditions to be satisfied in order for these exemptions to apply.

Equality requirement 
A key requirement for a trust to qualify as a UK EOT is that it meets the “equality requirement”.  
Prior to the Finance Act 2014, an employee trust (even one used for employee ownership purposes) would usually be drafted so as to meet certain less onerous requirements in the Inheritance Act (1984) relating to employee trusts (especially section 86). Under such employee trusts a trustee may make a distribution on bespoke terms to a selected beneficiary, whilst, in contrast, an EOT requires all eligible employees to benefit from any distributions on “same terms”.  This means EOT beneficiaries must either all receive an equal amount, or their benefit may vary by reference to their remuneration, length of service, or hours worked.
 
A similar concept applies to income tax free employee bonuses.  All individuals employed by the employer or another group company must be eligible to participate and (subject to limited possible exceptions) must all participate on the same terms.

Effect of introducing the EOT in the UK 
The Nuttall Review and EOT tax changes have stimulated wider interest in employee ownership.  Some existing employee-owned firms have changed their ownership structure to incorporate an EOT.  Added together newly created EOTs and deemed EOTs (pre-existing employee trusts that meet certain requirements), now represent more than three quarters of companies in the UK employee ownership sector and over half the total number of employees.

EOTs in the US 
There is some use of EOTs in the US.

In 2014, the international design firm Wimberly Allison Tong & Goo (WATG) became the first US company to create employee ownership through an English EOT.  WATG decided against a sale to an ESOP. Leadership wanted to avoid the cost and time requirements of creating and maintaining an ESOP, including legal work, administration, and valuation. They also wanted to avoid simply replacing their repurchase obligation from existing buy-sell agreements with an ESOP repurchase obligation.

In 2017, an Ann Arbor company, Arbor Assays, also became owned by an English EOT. This method of employee ownership was adopted to maintain the company perpetually for the benefit of its employees. Financially, the employees will benefit because, in addition to their basic pay, the company will annually allocate revenue not needed for company operations or future investment to participating employees.

Other US companies have also moved to this form of trust ownership using trusts established under domestic trust laws including:
Equity Atlas, an Oregon company, which, in 2016, launched the first EOT finance company in the US. Developed and devised with a social mission in mind, the company established a perpetual employee-owned trust that maintains worker-owner democratic control and equal profit-sharing in perpetuity
Metis Construction (2016)
Organically Grown Company (2018)
Paras and Associates (2019)
ShopBot (2021)

EOTs in Australia 
Employee Ownership Australia is working to introduce the EOT model to Australia.

References 

Employee relations
Wills and trusts